S110 may refer to :
 County Route S110 (Bergen County, New Jersey)
 S110 (Nissan Silvia), a 1979 car model
 S110 (Amsterdam), a city route in Amsterdam, the Netherlands
 Honda S110, a Honda motorcycle model
 a Canon Digital IXUS camera model
 a Canon PowerShot S110 camera model
 Irish Section 110 Special Purpose Vehicle (SPV), an Irish company structure